Jason Miller may refer to:
Jason Miller (baseball) (born 1982), American baseball player
Jason Miller (communications strategist)  (born c. 1974), American political and communications strategist
Jason Miller (government official), Chief Performance Officer of the United States
Jason Miller (fighter) (born 1980), American mixed martial arts fighter
Jason Miller (ice hockey) (born 1971), Canadian ice hockey player
Jason Miller (musician), American drummer from Pittsburgh, Pennsylvania
Jason Miller (playwright) (1939–2001), American playwright and actor, known for The Exorcist
Jason Miller (rabbi) (born 1976), American rabbi, entrepreneur, and technologist
Jason C. Miller (born 1972), American heavy metal musician
Jason P. Miller (born 1983), American mathematician
Jason Miller, a superhero character in the comic book series ''Rising Stars